Robert Washington (born July 11, 1947) is an American former professional basketball player. He played with the Kentucky Colonels during the 1969–70 season in the American Basketball Association (ABA) and with the Cleveland Cavaliers during the 1970–71 and 1971–72 seasons in the NBA.

On November 7, 1971, while playing for the Cavaliers in a home game against the Portland Trail Blazers, Washington recorded a career high 20 assists. At the time, the mark was also a Cleveland Cavaliers franchise record, later tied by Lenny Wilkens and broken by Geoff Huston.

See also
 List of National Basketball Association players with most assists in a game

References

External links

1947 births
Living people
American men's basketball players
Cleveland Cavaliers players
Eastern Kentucky Colonels men's basketball coaches
Eastern Kentucky Colonels men's basketball players
Florida A&M Rattlers basketball coaches
High school basketball coaches in Kentucky
Kentucky Colonels players
Basketball players from Lexington, Kentucky
Sportspeople from Lexington, Kentucky
Undrafted National Basketball Association players